Callistratia or Kallistratia was a town on the Black Sea coast of ancient Paphlagonia, at a distance of 20 stadia east of  (modern Kerempe Burnu). It was also called Marsilla or Marsylla, according to the anonymous Periplus.

Its site is tentatively located near Kışla in Asiatic Turkey.

References

Populated places in ancient Paphlagonia
Former populated places in Turkey
History of Kastamonu Province